BTA may refer to:

Butyric acid
Baltimore Transit Alliance
Basic Trading Area, a geographical area defined by the U.S. Federal Communications Commission
Becoming the Archetype, a Christian metal band
Benzotriazole
Bicycle Transportation Alliance
Bilateral trade agreement
Bilateral Terran Alliance, a fictional human alliance in the 1985 film Enemy Mine
Biological Terrain Assessment
Black Theatre Alliance, a federation of theater companies in New York City 
BlueTooth Address
Bolshoi Teleskop Azimutalnyi, a 6 m telescope located in Russia
Botswana Telecommunications Authority
British Tourist Authority
British Triathlon Association, the former name of the British Triathlon Federation
BTA Bank, of Kazakhstan, formerly Bank TuranAlem
Bulgarian News Agency
Business Technology Association
Business Transformation Agency
Board of Tax Appeals
Airport code for Blair Municipal Airport